Marek Střeštík (born 1 February 1987) is a Czech footballer who currently plays for Austrian club SV Waidhofen/Thaya.

He is half Czech and half Hungarian background; his father is ethnic Czech, his mother is Hungarian. Beside Czech, Střeštík also speaks Hungarian and Slovak on native level.

Career

Club career
Ahead of the 2019/20 season, Střeštík joined 1. SK Prostějov. He left the club at the end of 2019. In February 2020, he moved to Austrian club SV Langenrohr. On 7 May 2020, fellow league club, SV Waidhofen/Thaya, confirmed that Střeštík would join the club for the upcoming season.

Club statistics

Updated to games played as of 9 December 2017.

Honours
Czech Rupublic U-21
FIFA U-20 World Cup runner-up (1) 2007

References

External links
 
 Player profile 
 
 Marek Střeštík at ÖFB

1987 births
Living people
Sportspeople from Komárno
Czech people of Hungarian descent
Czech footballers
Association football midfielders
Czech Republic youth international footballers
Czech Republic under-21 international footballers
Czech Republic international footballers
Czech First League players
Nemzeti Bajnokság I players
AC Sparta Prague players
FC Zbrojovka Brno players
Győri ETO FC players
MTK Budapest FC players
Mezőkövesdi SE footballers
Kisvárda FC players
Gyirmót FC Győr players
1. SK Prostějov players
Czech expatriate footballers
Expatriate footballers in Hungary
Expatriate footballers in Austria
Czech expatriate sportspeople in Hungary
Czech expatriate sportspeople in Austria